The prime minister of France, officially the prime minister of the French Republic, is the head of government of the French Republic and the leader of the Council of Ministers.

The prime minister is the holder of the second-highest office in France, after the president of France. The president, who appoints but cannot dismiss the prime minister, can ask for their resignation. The Government of France, including the prime minister, can be dismissed by the National Assembly. Upon appointment, the prime minister proposes a list of ministers to the president. Decrees and decisions signed by the prime minister, like almost all executive decisions, are subject to the oversight of the administrative court system. Some decrees are taken after advice from the Council of State, over which the prime minister is entitled to preside. Ministers defend the programmes of their ministries to the prime minister, who makes budgetary choices. The extent to which those decisions lie with the prime minister or president often depends upon whether they are of the same political party. If so, the president may serve as both the head of state and de facto head of government, while the prime minister serves as his deputy.

Jean Castex resigned as Prime Minister on 16 May 2022, and President Emmanuel Macron appointed Élisabeth Borne, Minister of Labour, Employment and Integration, as his successor the same day. Her government, the first led by a woman since Édith Cresson in 1992, was announced four days later on 20 May. Cresson and Borne are the only women to serve as Prime Minister.

Nomination 
The prime minister is appointed by the president of France, who is theoretically free to pick whomever they please for the post. In practice, because the National Assembly does have the power to force the resignation of the government by adopting a motion of censure, the choice of prime minister must reflect the will of the majority in the National Assembly. Notably, immediately after the legislative election of 1986, President François Mitterrand had to appoint Jacques Chirac as prime minister although Chirac was a member of the Rally for the Republic and therefore a political opponent of Mitterrand. While Mitterrand's Socialist Party was the largest party in the National Assembly, it did not have an absolute majority. The RPR had an alliance with the Union for French Democracy, which gave them a majority. Such a situation, in which the president is forced to work with a prime minister who is a political opponent, is called a cohabitation.

While prime ministers are usually chosen from amongst the ranks of the National Assembly, on rare occasions the president has selected a non-officeholder because of their experience in bureaucracy or foreign service, or their success in business management—Dominique de Villepin, most notably, served as prime minister from 2005 to 2007 without ever having held elected office.

Although the president's choice of prime minister must be in accordance with the majority in the National Assembly, a prime minister does not have to ask for a vote of confidence after their government's formation. They can base their legitimacy on the president's assignment as prime minister and approval of the government. However, it is traditionally expected that the government seeks a motion of confidence upon entering office.

Role
According to article 21 of the Constitution, the prime minister "shall direct the actions of the Government". Additionally, Article 20 stipulates that the government "shall determine and conduct the policy of the Nation", and it includes domestic issues, while the president concentrates on formulating directions on national defense and foreign policy while arbitrating the efficient service of all governmental authorities in France. Other members of the government are appointed by the president "on the recommendation of the prime minister". In practice the prime minister acts in harmony with the president to whom he is a subordinate, except when there is a cohabitation. In such cases, a constitutional convention gives the prime minister primacy in domestic affairs, while the president oversees foreign affairs. His responsibilities, then, are akin to those of a prime minister in a parliamentary system.

The prime minister can "engage the responsibility" of their government before the National Assembly. This process consists of placing a bill before the assembly, and either the assembly overthrows the government, or the bill is passed automatically (article 49). In addition to ensuring that the government still has support in the house, some bills that might prove too controversial to pass through the normal assembly rules are able to be passed this way.

The prime minister may also submit a bill that has not been yet signed into law to the Constitutional Council (article 61). Before they are allowed to dissolve the assembly, the president has to consult the prime minister and the presidents of both houses of Parliament (article 12). They are, as the representative of the government, the only member of the government able to introduce legislation in Parliament.

History

Under the Third Republic, the French Constitutional Laws of 1875 titled the head of government as the "President of the Council of Ministers", though he was informally called "prime minister" or "premier" outside of France.

The president of the council was vested with similar formal powers to those of the prime minister of the United Kingdom. In practice, however, this proved insufficient to command the confidence of France's multi-party parliament. Most notably, the legislature had the power to force the entire cabinet out of office by a vote of censure. As a result, cabinets were often toppled twice a year, and there were long stretches where France was left with only a caretaker government. Under the circumstances, the president of the council was usually a fairly weak figure whose strength was more dependent on charisma than formal powers. Often, he was little more than primus inter pares, and was more the cabinet's chairman than its leader.

After several unsuccessful attempts to strengthen the role in the first half of the twentieth century, a semi-presidential system was introduced under the Fifth Republic. It was at this point that the post was formally named "Prime Minister" and took its present form. The 1958 Constitution includes several provisions intended to strengthen the prime minister's position, for instance by restricting the legislature's power to censure the government. As a result, a prime minister has only been censured once during the existence of the Fifth Republic, in 1962 when Georges Pompidou was toppled over objections to President Charles de Gaulle's effort to have the president popularly elected. However, at the ensuing 1962 French legislative election, de Gaulle's coalition won an increased majority, and Pompidou was reappointed prime minister.

Present
Élisabeth Borne has served as Prime Minister since 16 May 2022.

Fifth Republic records

 The only person to serve as prime minister more than once under the Fifth Republic was Jacques Chirac (1974–1976 and 1986–1988).
 The youngest appointed prime minister was Laurent Fabius, on 17 July 1984. He was 37 years old.
 The oldest appointed prime minister was Pierre Bérégovoy, on 2 April 1992. He was 66 years old.
 Two women have been appointed at the head of government: Édith Cresson and Élisabeth Borne.
 Two prime ministers were mayor of Bordeaux, and at the same time prime minister, Jacques Chaban-Delmas (1969–1972) and Alain Juppé (1995–1997).
 The longest-serving prime minister was Georges Pompidou, 6 years, 2 months and 26 days, from 1962 to 1968.
 The shortest-serving prime minister was Bernard Cazeneuve, 5 months and 4 days, from 2016 to 2017.
 Three prime ministers were born abroad: Édouard Balladur in İzmir, Turkey; Dominique de Villepin in Rabat, Morocco; and Manuel Valls in Barcelona, Spain.

See also
First Minister of State
List of prime ministers of France

References

External links

 
1958 establishments in France